Dead Boy Detectives is an upcoming fantasy drama streaming television series developed by Steve Yockey based on the DC Comics characters of the same name by Neil Gaiman and Matt Wagner. It is set to premiere on Netflix.

Cast and characters

Main 
 George Rexstrew as Edwin Payne
 Jayden Revri as Charles Rowland
 Kassius Nelson as Crystal Palace
 Briana Cuoco as Jenny the Butcher
 Ruth Connell as the Nightmare Nurse
 Yuyu Kitamura as Niko
 Jenn Lyon as Esther

Recurring 
 Lukas Gage as Thomas The Cat King
 Michael Beach as Tragic Mick
 Joshua Colley as Monty
 Lindsey Gort as Maxine
 Caitlin Reilly as Lily
 Max Jenkins as Kingham
 David Iacono as David the Demon

Production

Development 
On September 3, 2021, Variety reported that HBO Max ordered a pilot for a potential series. On April 14, 2022, HBO Max gave the production a series order. On February 24, 2023, the series was moved from HBO Max to Netflix. The series was reportedly moved due to being incompatible with DC Studios co-CEOs James Gunn and Peter Safran's plans to have HBO Max's DC shows be set in the DC Universe, as well as due to the HBO Max's inability to market the series before 2024.

Casting 
In November 2021, George Rexstrew, Jayden Revri, Kassius Nelson, Alexander Calvert, Briana Cuoco, Ruth Connell, Yuyu Kitamura, and Jenn Lyon were cast. Lukas Gage replaced Calvert in September 2022. In October 2022, Michael Beach, Joshua Colley, and Lindsey Gort joined the cast in recurring capacities. A month later, Caitlin Reilly, Max Jenkins, and David Iacono were cast.

Filming 
The pilot episode was filmed between December 2021 and January 2022, with Lee Toland Krieger directing. Filming for the series began on November 7, 2022, in Vancouver, Canada, and is scheduled to conclude on March 20, 2023.

References

External links 
 

American fantasy drama television series
English-language television shows
Television series by Warner Bros. Television Studios
Television shows based on DC Comics
Television shows filmed in Vancouver
Upcoming Netflix original programming
Upcoming television series